In oceanic biogeochemistry, the solubility pump is a physico-chemical process that transports carbon as dissolved inorganic carbon (DIC) from the ocean's surface to its interior.

Overview

The solubility pump is driven by the coincidence of two processes in the ocean :

 The solubility of carbon dioxide is a strong inverse function of seawater temperature (i.e. solubility is greater in cooler water)
 The thermohaline circulation is driven by the formation of deep water at high latitudes where seawater is usually cooler and denser

Since deep water (that is, seawater in the ocean's interior) is formed under the same surface conditions that promote carbon dioxide solubility, it contains a higher concentration of dissolved inorganic carbon than might be expected from average surface concentrations.  Consequently, these two processes act together to pump carbon from the atmosphere into the ocean's interior.

One consequence of this is that when deep water upwells in warmer, equatorial latitudes, it strongly outgasses carbon dioxide to the atmosphere because of the reduced solubility of the gas.

The solubility pump has a biological counterpart known as the biological pump.  For an overview of both pumps, see Raven & Falkowski (1999).

Carbon dioxide solubility

Carbon dioxide, like other gases, is soluble in water.  However, unlike many other gases (oxygen for instance), it reacts with water and forms a balance of several ionic and non-ionic species (collectively known as dissolved inorganic carbon, or DIC).  These are dissolved free carbon dioxide (CO2 (aq)), carbonic acid (H2CO3), bicarbonate (HCO3−) and carbonate (CO32−), and they interact with water as follows :

The balance of these carbonate species (which ultimately affects the solubility of carbon dioxide), is dependent on factors such as pH, as shown in a Bjerrum plot.  In seawater this is regulated by the charge balance of a number of positive (e.g. Na+, K+, Mg2+, Ca2+) and negative (e.g. CO32− itself, Cl−, SO42−, Br−) ions.  Normally, the balance of these species leaves a net positive charge. With respect to the carbonate system, this excess positive charge shifts the balance of carbonate species towards negative ions to compensate.  The result of which is a reduced concentration of the free carbon dioxide and carbonic acid species, which in turn leads to an oceanic uptake of carbon dioxide from the atmosphere to restore balance.  Thus, the greater the positive charge imbalance, the greater the solubility of carbon dioxide.  In carbonate chemistry terms, this imbalance is referred to as alkalinity.

In terms of measurement, four basic parameters are of key importance: Total inorganic carbon (TIC, T or CT), Total alkalinity (TALK or AT), pH, and pCO2.  Measuring any two of these parameters allows for the determination of a wide range of pH-dependent species (including the above-mentioned species).  This balance can be changed by a number of processes.  For example, the air-sea flux of CO2, the dissolution/precipitation of CaCO3, or biological activity such as photosynthesis/respiration.  Each of these has different effects on each of the four basic parameters, and together they exert strong influences on global cycles.  The net and local charge of the oceans remains neutral during any chemical process.

Anthropogenic changes

The combustion of fossil fuels, land-use changes, and the production of cement have led to a flux of CO2 to the atmosphere.  Presently, about one third (approximately 2 gigatons of carbon per year) of anthropogenic emissions of CO2 are believed to be entering the ocean.  The solubility pump is the primary mechanism driving this flux, with the consequence that anthropogenic CO2 is reaching the ocean interior via high latitude sites of deep water formation (particularly the North Atlantic).  Ultimately, most of the CO2 emitted by human activities will dissolve in the ocean, however the rate at which the ocean will take it up in the future is less certain.

In a study of carbon cycle up to the end of the 21st century, Cox et al. (2000) predicted that the rate of CO2 uptake will begin to saturate at a maximum rate at 5 gigatons of carbon per year by 2100.  This was partially due to non-linearities in the seawater carbonate system, but also due to climate change.  Ocean warming decreases the solubility of CO2 in seawater, slowing the ocean's response to emissions.  Warming also acts to increase ocean stratification, isolating the surface ocean from deeper waters.  Additionally, changes in the ocean's thermohaline circulation (specifically slowing) may act to decrease transport of dissolved CO2 into the deep ocean.  However, the magnitude of these processes is still uncertain, preventing good long-term estimates of the fate of the solubility pump.

While ocean absorption of anthropogenic CO2 from the atmosphere acts to decrease climate change, it causes ocean acidification which is believed will have negative consequences for marine ecosystems.

See also
 Alkalinity
 Biological pump
 Continental shelf pump
 Ocean acidification
 Thermohaline circulation
 Total inorganic carbon

References

Aquatic ecology
Carbon cycle
Chemical oceanography
Geochemistry